William Parker (13 October 1862 – 11 September 1930) was a New Zealand cricketer. He played 25 first-class matches for Otago between 1880 and 1897.

See also
 List of Otago representative cricketers

References

External links
 

1862 births
1930 deaths
New Zealand cricketers
Otago cricketers
Cricketers from Melbourne